Qaleh Joqeh or Qaleh Jeqeh or Qaleh Jeqqeh may refer to:
 Qaleh Joqeh, Divandarreh
 Qaleh Jeqeh-ye Sofla, Divandarreh County
 Qaleh Jeqqeh, Saheb, Saqqez County
 Qaleh Joqeh, Tilakuh, Saqqez County

See also
 Qaleh Jugheh
 Qaleh Juqeh